Rinn is a municipality in Austria.

Rinn or rINN may also refer to:

 Rinn (surname), a list of people
 Rinn Lough, a lake in Ireland
 Recommended international nonproprietary name (rINN), an official generic and nonproprietary name given to a pharmaceutical drug or active ingredient

See also
 Rin (disambiguation)
 RIN (disambiguation)
 Rinne (disambiguation)